Sainte-Croix station is located on line  of the tramway de Bordeaux.

Location
The station is located on Sainte-Croix quay in Bordeaux.

Close by
 Église Sainte-Croix
 Conservatoire
 The quays

See also
 TBC
 Tramway de Bordeaux

Bordeaux tramway stops
Tram stops in Bordeaux
Railway stations in France opened in 2004